Sports is an important part of the culture of Odisha and hence it plays a key role in development of the state. Field hockey, athletics, tennis, rugby union, rugby sevens, association football and cricket is the most popular sports in the Indian state of Odisha.
It is also called as 'Sports Capital'.
The Kalinga Stadium in Bhubaneswar hosted the 2018 Men's Hockey World Cup from 28 November to 16 December 2018.

Events
Odisha have been hosting various sporting events in the recent years.

Athletics

Badminton

Football

Hockey

Rugby

Table Tennis

Tennis

Leagues

State

National

National Leagues Hosted by Odisha

Football

Hockey

Field hockey

Field hockey is the most popular sport in the state. In a first-of-its-kind association, the Government of Odisha, has become the first state government in India to sponsor a national team. In early 2018, the government launched its sporting logo, signing a five-year sponsorship agreement with Hockey India, replacing the former sponsors. Odisha field hockey team has been providing India, with some extremely talented players, who eventually are called up for the national teams, i.e. India men's national field hockey team and India women's national field hockey team.

The 3rd and the last edition of the FIH Hockey World League, i.e. the qualification stage for the 2018 Men's Hockey World Cup, was held in Kalinga Stadium in Bhubaneswar, Odisha

The 14th edition of the Hockey World Cup i.e. 2018 Men's Hockey World Cup, was held from 28 November to 16 December 2018, at the Kalinga Stadium in Bhubaneswar, Odisha. Belgium turned out to be the champions after defeating Netherlands in the Final on 16 December 2018.

In 2019, the Government of Odisha, Tata Steel & Tata Trusts (Hockey Ace foundation) joined hands to launch Odisha Naval Tata Hockey High Performance Centre to train and prepare the next generation of hockey talent in the state.

Athletics
Sport of athletics is another major sport in the state. Odisha has been producing some of the India's finest athletes who dominate in national and international sporting events. The 22nd edition of the Asian Athletics Championships i.e. 2017 Asian Athletics Championships, was held from 6 to 9 July 2017 at the Kalinga Stadium in Bhubaneswar, Odisha, India. Around 560 athletes from 41 countries attended the international event.

Football
Association football is also an uprising, popular sport in Odisha. Football Association of Odisha (FAO) is the administrating governing body for football in Odisha. In women's football particularly, the Odisha women's football team has dominated at national levels. They have a team Odisha FC that plays and compete with others in ISL.

Rugby
Rugby is popular both in men and women categories in Odisha. The Odisha Rugby Football Association is the state's administrating body for rugby football in Odisha. The Odisha women's rugby union team and Odisha women's rugby sevens team have been dominating since the past decade having won nearly all competitions at national levels. On the other hand, Odisha rugby union team and Odisha rugby sevens team have also made odisha proud with their performance at national levels. Both men and women of Odisha have provided India some of its best players. 
Odisha will be hosting the Asia Rugby Women's Championship from 26 to 28 October 2018.

High Performance Centres

The Government of Odisha, in collaboration with various entities, have launched a few High Performance Centres at Kalinga Stadium in order to provide high-class training, facilities and infrastructure to the young sportsmen of Odisha. The list of HPCs is as follows: 

 Abhinav Bindra Targeting Performance (ABTP)
 Dalmia Bharat Gopichand Badminton Academy
 JSW Swimming HPC
 Khelo India State Centre of Excellence (KISCE) for Athletics, Hockey, and Weightlifting
 KJS Ahluwalia and Tenvic Sports HPC for Weightlifting
 Odisha Naval Tata Hockey High Performance Centre (ONTHHPC) 
 Odisha Aditya Birla and Gagan Narang Shooting HPC
 Reliance Foundation Odisha Athletics HPC
SAI Regional Badminton Academy
AIFF High Performance Centre

References

External links
 Odisha Government Portal
 Sports & Youth Services (Government of Odisha)
 Odisha Naval Tata Hockey HPC official website

Sport in Odisha